Weeksville in an unincorporated community in Pasquotank County, North Carolina, United States.  It lies roughly midway on NC 344, at an elevation of 3 feet (0.91 m). The community is home to Weeksville Elementary School, a Methodist church, gas station, volunteer fire department, Lions Club chapter and county recycling center.

Of historical significance are the facilities of the dirigible manufacturer TCom, located on the former grounds of  Naval Air Station Weeksville.  Two dirigible hangars, one steel and one wooden, were constructed at NAS Weeksville in 1942. The larger wooden hangar, one of the largest wooden structures in the world, succumbed to fire on August 3, 1995. The slightly smaller steel hangar, the Weeksville Dirigible Hangar, one of the world's largest steel structures, remains as of 2015.

During World War II flight operations out of NAS Weeksville were instrumental in repelling German U-boat attacks on Allied merchant shipping along the Eastern Seaboard.

It is part of the Elizabeth City Micropolitan Statistical Area.

References

External links
 Abandoned & Little-Known Airfields: Northeastern North Carolina - NAS Weeksville
 TCom
 Our State article - 'Lighter Than Air': NAS Weeksville - February 2012

Unincorporated communities in Pasquotank County, North Carolina
Unincorporated communities in North Carolina